The Handa Faldo Cambodian Classic was a golf tournament on the Asian Tour. It was played for in March 2012 at the Angkor Golf Resort in Siem Reap, Cambodia. Title sponsors were Dr. Haruhisa Handa of the International Sports Promotion Society and golfer Nick Faldo. The purse was US$300,000. American David Lipsky won the event in a playoff with Elmer Salvador.

Winners

References

External links
Coverage on the Asian Tour's official site

Former Asian Tour events
Sport in Cambodia
International sports competitions hosted by Cambodia
International Sports Promotion Society